The 1955 Preakness Stakes was the 80th Preakness Stakes overall and it was held on May 28, 1955 at the Pimlico Race Course in Baltimore, Maryland. Nashua, ridden by Eddie Arcaro and trained by James E. Fitzsimmons won the race, outrunning Saratoga who finished second. Traffic Judge, who was trained by Woody Stephens finished third.

Nashua's winning time of 1:54 3/5 for the mile and three-sixteenth race on dirt broke the Pimlico track record.

Background

Going into the race, Nashua was the favorite despite coming off a loss to Swaps in the 1955 Kentucky Derby. Saratoga was the second favorite and had previously lost to Nashua prior to the Preakness.

Results

The chart below is the results of the 1955 Preakness Stakes.

 Scratched: Chuck Thomson
 Winning Breeder: Belair Stud; (KY)
 Winning Time: 1:54 3/5 (new track record)
 Track Rating: Fast
 Total Attendance: 35,608

References

1955 in horse racing
Preakness Stakes races
1955 in sports in Maryland